Ograda is a commune located in Ialomița County, Muntenia, Romania. It is composed of a single village, Ograda.

The commune lies on the Wallachian Plain, on the left bank of the Ialomița River.

Natives
Jonel Perlea (1900–1970), conductor

References

Communes in Ialomița County
Localities in Muntenia